The C-class Melbourne tram is a fleet of three-section Alstom Citadis 202 trams built in La Rochelle, France that operate on the Melbourne tram network. They were the first low-floor trams in Melbourne, being delivered in 2001-2002.

History
To meet a franchise commitment to introduce new trams to replace Z-class trams, 36 three-section Alstom Citadis 202 low-floor trams were purchased by Yarra Trams. They were the first low-floor trams in Melbourne, and the first tram imported for the Melbourne tram system since the 1920s.

The design was adapted by Alstom for local conditions, with the first four trams arriving at Webb Dock on 10 August 2001. Following fit-out and testing at Preston Workshops, they entered service on 12 October 2001. The last arrived on 25 June 2002 and entered service on 30 August 2002. All C1-class trams initially operated solely on route 109.

Criticisms
The Citadis trams have been criticised by the Australian Rail Tram & Bus Industry Union (RTBU), who claim they have operational problems, including injuries to the drivers relating to design. There were concerns raised in 2011 regarding the rear-vision cameras fitted to the trams. Despite Yarra Trams replacing the cameras a number of times, there were visibility problems at night and in high glare situations. These had been solved by July 2012.

The trams have also been described by the RTBU as "cheap as chips", following allegations that swaying and lateral forces at "speeds above 25 km/h" were causing driver injuries. Yarra Trams responded by stating that they were offering drivers lumbar support, and that track renewal had improved ride quality, reducing sway, while the driver's controls had been changed to avoid wrist injuries.

Tram number 3011 has derailed three times, most recently on Sunday 6 October 2019. Each derailment occurred after a collision with a car. The RTBU has again said the model should be removed from service.

Operation
C-class trams operate on the following routes:
48: Balwyn North - Victoria Harbour Docklands
109: Box Hill - Port Melbourne

References

External links

Alstom trams
Articulated passenger trains
Melbourne tram vehicles
Alstom multiple units
600 V DC multiple units